Jiji is an African online marketplace that provides buyers and sellers with an avenue to meet and exchange goods and services.

History
As at January 2018, it held over 800,000 ads, attracting over 160,000 sellers and 7 million original users per months, who look for bargains in cars, household goods, mobile phones, cosmetics, toys, pets, livestock, electronics, services, and most recently, to look for jobs by searching through job vacancies. From the report by The Economist Intelligence Unit (EIU), Jiji is one of the main online retailers of the country — serve a mass-market clientele. As at March 8, 2018, Jiji is ranked as the 39th overall most visited website in Nigeria by Alexa, and as the 32nd TOP site in Nigeria for all categories by SimilarWeb.

Jiji was founded in 2014 in Lagos, Nigeria by Anton Volianskyi, who is the company's CEO. In autumn 2015 Jiji started a project known as Jiji blog, providing visitors with the information on business, technologies, entertainment, lifestyle, tips, life stories, news.

In 2016, Jiji partnered with Airtel, a global telecommunications services company. This meant that customers to Jiji site will not pay for data if they access the websites via Airtel network.

In November 2016, Jiji held the first conference for sellers, which took place in Westown Hotel in Lagos. 

In April 2017, Jiji received Nigeria Internet Registration Association Awards as the most innovative online service of the year in Nigeria. In May 2017, Jiji emerged as the finalist of The West Africa Mobile Awards (WAMAS), having entered the top 5 representatives in Commerce & Retail Category

In 2020, the company launched website and app in Ethiopia.

In June 2021, Jiji has acquired an automotive company Cars45 in Nigeria, Kenya, and Ghana. 

There is also a separate corporate website dedicated to the main achievements and mission of this brand.

Competition 
Jiji faces competition from other dominant African digital commerce platforms, such as  Olist in Nigeria or PigiaMe in Kenya.

Mobile application
Jiji has the mobile version of the website, developed for Android and iOS which is available in Nigeria, Kenya, Ghana, Uganda, Tanzania, and Ethiopia. According to the Google Play statistics, Jiji App is in the list of ten most downloaded apps in Nigeria.

References

External links
Jiji Africa
Jiji Nigeria
Jiji Kenya
Jiji Ghana 
Jiji Uganda 
Jiji Tanzania
Jiji Ethiopia 
Jiji Sénégal 
Jiji Côte d'Ivoire

Online marketplaces of Nigeria
Marketing companies established in 2014
Companies based in Lagos